The UEFA European Under-21 Futsal Tournament was a futsal competition organised by UEFA. As of 2020, only one edition of the competition has ever been played. The 2008 tournament was hosted and won by Russia who defeated Italy 5–4 in the final.

Results

See also
UEFA Futsal Championship

References

International futsal competitions
Futsal, Under-21 Championship
Futsal competitions in Europe
2007–08 in European futsal
International futsal competitions hosted by Russia
European youth sports competitions
Recurring sporting events established in 2008
2008 establishments in Europe
Recurring sporting events disestablished in 2008
2008 disestablishments in Europe